Alain J. Picard (born April 30, 1974) is an American figurative, landscape, and portrait painter and writer. He resides in Southbury, Connecticut.

Early life

Born in Stamford, Connecticut, he earned a bachelor of arts in illustration from Western Connecticut State University and studied at the Art Students League of New York.

Career

Influenced by John Singer Sargent, Edgar Degas, and Joaquín Sorolla, Picard's work has been featured in The Artist's Magazine and The Pastel Journal and has been recognized by The Portrait Society of America, The Hudson Valley Art Association, The Connecticut Society of Portrait Artists, The Connecticut Pastel Society, and The Pastel Society of America.

In 2004, The Artist's Magazine highlighted Picard as one of the 20 contemporary artists “On the Rise.”  In 2009, Picard's work was recognized with the “Best Portfolio Award” by the Portrait Society of America.

He has written a series of art instructional books for Walter T. Foster Publishing, owned by The Quarto Group, including:

Pastel Basics: Learn fundamental techniques for using this fun and colorful medium (2014)
Mastering Pastel: Capturing the beauty of the world around you in this colorful medium (2015)
Beginning Drawing: A multidimensional approach to learning the art of basic drawing (2016)

In addition, he has hosted a series of art instructional DVDs and videos for the Artist's Network, owned by F+W Media, including:

Painting the Figure in Pastel (2014)
Capturing Light and Color: Landscape in Pastel (2014)
Capturing Light & Form: Still Life in Pastel (2014)
Pastel Techniques for Painterly Portraits (2013)
Painting Skin Tones in Pastel (2013)
Essential Techniques for Pastel Portraits (2013)

In 2013 and 2014 he collaborated with Terry Ludwig Pastels to create two unique Picard pastel sets.

Alain is a judge and juror of international exhibitions, and a sought-after workshop instructor.

Selected Works and Gallery

External links
Alain J. Picard official website

References

Painters from Connecticut
American portrait painters
21st-century American painters
21st-century American male artists
1974 births
Living people
American male painters